Redtop Peak is a mountain in South West Tasmania.  It lies on the North West end of the Frankland Range and the South West end of the Madonna Ridge above the impoundment Lake Pedder, to the west of The Cupola.

See also
 Lake Pedder
 Strathgordon, Tasmania
 South West Wilderness

References
 Solitary, Edition 1 2001, Tasmania 1:25000 Series, Tasmap

Mountains of Tasmania
South West Tasmania